Birmingham Erdington is a parliamentary constituency in Birmingham, England, represented in the House of Commons of the Parliament of the United Kingdom since 2022 by Paulette Hamilton of the Labour Party.

Members of Parliament

MPs 1918–1955

MPs since 1974

Constituency profile
The constituency is predominantly white working class and very deprived, has quite considerable social housing and has a high proportion of adults of working age in a low income bracket when compared to the West Midlands as a whole. Since the seat was recreated in 1974, only Labour MPs have been elected, although Conservative candidates reduced the majority to three figures in 1979 and 1983; both of which resulted in victories for the party as a whole nationwide. In the 2016 United Kingdom European Union membership referendum, 63% of people voted to leave the EU whilst 37% voted to remain.

Boundaries

2010–: The City of Birmingham wards of Erdington, Kingstanding, Stockland Green, and Tyburn.

1997–2010: The City of Birmingham wards of Erdington, Kingsbury (Tyburn from 2004), Kingstanding, and Stockland Green.

1983–1997: The City of Birmingham wards of Erdington, Kingsbury, and Stockland Green.

1974–1983: The County Borough of Birmingham wards of Erdington, Gravelly Hill, and Stockland Green.

1950–1955: The County Borough of Birmingham wards of Bromford, Erdington, and Gravelly Hill.

1918–1950: The County Borough of Birmingham wards of Erdington North, Erdington South, and Washwood Heath, and part of Aston ward.

In the north-east of the city of Birmingham, this is a mix of council estates, some of which are now private homes under the Right to Buy, the large Kingstanding estate and Castle Vale being examples, and generally more affluent suburbs which are private housing particularly towards the Sutton Coldfield border in Erdington itself, the strongest Conservative ward in the seat. Spanning to the city's green belt, the area includes for example Birmingham Spaghetti Junction motorway junction.

Elections

Elections in the 2020s

Elections in the 2010s

Elections in the 2000s

Elections in the 1990s

Elections in the 1980s

Elections in the 1970s

Elections in the 1950s

Elections in the 1940s

Elections in the 1930s

Elections in the 1920s

Election in the 1910s

See also
List of parliamentary constituencies in the West Midlands (county)

Notes

References

External links 
 Birmingham city council constituency page

Erdington
Parliamentary constituencies in Birmingham, West Midlands
Constituencies of the Parliament of the United Kingdom established in 1918
Constituencies of the Parliament of the United Kingdom disestablished in 1955
Constituencies of the Parliament of the United Kingdom established in 1974